Weissenfelser Handballverein '91 e.V. (a.k.a. WHV '91) is a German women's handball club from Weissenfels. It was founded in 1991, following the reunification of Germany, from the fusion of local clubs Fortschritt and Vorwärts, and it currently plays in the Saxony-Anhalt regional category.

Fortschritt Weissenfels was one of the leading teams in the early stages in the DDR-Oberliga winning six championships between 1955 and 1964. In 1963 it became the first team to represent East Germany in the European Cup, reaching the competition's semifinals.

Titles
 East German Championship
 1955, 1958, 1959, 1962, 1963, 1964

References

External links
 Official website

German handball clubs
Sport in Saxony-Anhalt
Handball clubs established in 1991
1991 establishments in Germany